Kartunes is a series of 12 theatrical shorts subjects released from 1951 to 1953. The series was produced by Famous Studios for Paramount Pictures. It succeeded the Screen Songs series because Paramount Pictures lost the rights to the series' name and the term "Bouncing Ball" couldn't be used any more. Even though the series ended in 1953, Famous produced Candy Cabaret and Hobo’s Holiday, which are part of the Noveltoons series.

The opening theme of each cartoon was "Sing a Song of Sixpence".

Filmography

Note: Hysterical History is the only Kartunes short in the public domain.Note 2: Dizzy Dinosaurs and Forest Fantasy are the only Kartune films which featuring Inchy the Worm.

TV distribution
The cartoons were later sold to TV distribution by Harvey Films to replace the original titles with the Harvey reissued ones, later being syndicated by Worldvision Enterprises. Currently, the Harvey reissued cartoons are distributed by NBCUniversal Television Distribution through its DreamWorks Animation subsidiary and their DreamWorks Classics unit.

References

External links

Famous Studios series and characters
Animated film series
American animated short films
Film series introduced in 1951
Sing-along